Byron Birdsall (December 18, 1937 – December 4, 2016) was an American painter. He was "one of Alaska's most renowned watercolorists" according to the Alaska Dispatch News.

Early life
Byron Birdsall was born on December 18, 1937, in Buckeye, Arizona. He grew up in Los Angeles, California, where his father was a Christian minister.

Birdsall graduated from the Seattle Pacific University and Stanford University.

Career
Birdsall started his career as a history teacher in California. After teaching for six years, he worked in advertising in Alaska.

Birdsall was a prolific painter in Alaska for five decades. He painted landscapes and portraits, both in watercolour and oil paintings. He did many paintings of Anchorage.

Birdsall did prints from the early part of his career onwards. For example, he designed a limited edition of 500 prints for the commemoration of the dedication of the Russian Bishop's House in 1988. Meanwhile, in 1991, Birdsall designed stamps for the state of Alaska. At the Seward Music & Arts Festival in Seward, Alaska in September 2015, he did a mural with 50-60 volunteers representing two kayakers at the Aialik Glacier for the main building of the Kenai Fjords National Park.

Birdsall was the author of several art books.

Personal life and death
Birdsall was married twice. With his first wife Lynn, who was a watercolourist, he had a son, Joshua, and a daughter, Courtenay. After his first wife died of cancer in 1998, he married Bilie, with whom he resided in Anchorage, Alaska and on Whidbey Island in Washington.

Birdsall died of heart failure on December 4, 2016.

Works

References

1937 births
2016 deaths
People from Buckeye, Arizona
Artists from Anchorage, Alaska
People from Island County, Washington
Seattle Pacific University alumni
Stanford University alumni
Painters from Alaska
20th-century American painters
21st-century American painters
21st-century American male artists
American male painters
American watercolorists
American stamp designers
20th-century American male artists